Bacidina is a genus of lichens in the family Ramalinaceae. It was circumscribed by Czech lichenologist Antonín Vězda in 1990, with Bacidina phacodes assigned as the type species. Vězda included 11 species in Bacidina, which was originally classified in the Lecideaceae. These species had previously been placed in genus Bacidia.

Species

Bacidina adastra 
Bacidina aeruginosa 
Bacidina apiahica 
Bacidina arnoldiana 
Bacidina arvidssonii 
Bacidina assulata 
Bacidina brandii 
Bacidina brittoniana 
Bacidina californica 
Bacidina caligans 
Bacidina canariensis 
Bacidina chloroticula 
Bacidina cinnamomea 
Bacidina circumpulla 
Bacidina clauzadei 
Bacidina contecta 
Bacidina convexa  – Panama
Bacidina crystallifera 
Bacidina defecta 
Bacidina delicata 
Bacidina dichroma 
Bacidina digitalis 
Bacidina dissecta 
Bacidina egenula 
Bacidina etayana 
Bacidina flavoleprosa 
Bacidina fuscosquamulosa 
Bacidina hypophylla 
Bacidina indigens 
Bacidina inundata 
Bacidina iqbalii 
Bacidina jasonhurii 
Bacidina lacerata 
Bacidina loekoesiana 
Bacidina margallensis 
Bacidina medialis 
Bacidina mendax  – Europe
Bacidina mirabilis 
Bacidina modesta 
Bacidina multiseptata 
Bacidina neglecta 
Bacidina neosquamulosa 
Bacidina neotropica 
Bacidina pallidocarnea 
Bacidina pallidocarpa  – Macaronesia
Bacidina phacodes 
Bacidina piceae 
Bacidina pseudohyphophorifera 
Bacidina pseudoisidiata  – Tenerife
Bacidina pycnidiata 
Bacidina saxenii 
Bacidina scutellifera 
Bacidina simplex 
Bacidina sorediata 
Bacidina streimannii 
Bacidina sulphurella 
Bacidina terricola 
Bacidina varia 
Bacidina vasakii 
Bacidina violacea  – Macaronesia

References

 
Lichen genera
Lecanorales genera
Taxa described in 1991
Taxa named by Antonín Vězda